Nerl or NERL may refer to:

 Nerl (urban-type settlement), a settlement in Ivanovo Oblast, Russia
 Nerl (Klyazma), a river in the Yaroslavl, Ivanovo, and Vladimir Oblasts, tributary of the Klyazma
 Nerl (Volga), a river in the Yaroslavl and Tver Oblasts, tributary of the Volga
 National Equal Rights League, oldest American organization dedicated to black liberation
 National Exposure Research Laboratory, a division of the United States Environmental Protection Agency
 Newark-Elizabeth Rail Link, a light rail line proposed in the American state of New Jersey
 NorthEast Research Libraries Consortium, see Center for Research Libraries